Sumaiya Shimu is a Bangladeshi model and television actress. She has been acting on television dramas since 1999.

Early life and education
Shimu grew up in Narail. She earned master's degree from Jahangirnagar University. She completed her PhD in 2017.

Career
Shimu debuted her television career through the drama Ekhane Ator Paoa Jai.

Personal life
Shimu married Nazrul Islam, a country director of Relief International an American-based non-government organization, on 28 August 2015.

Works
Films
 Bachelor (2004)
Television dramas
 House full 
 Sonalu Phul
 Projapoti Mon
 Chhokka (2011)
 Teen Jonaki (2012)
 Lake Drive Lane (2015)
 Briefcase (2015)
 Protarok Priyodorshini (2015)

Television appearances

References

External links
 

Living people
People from Narail District
Bangladeshi television actresses
Jahangirnagar University alumni
Year of birth missing (living people)
Place of birth missing (living people)
Best TV Actress Meril-Prothom Alo Award winners